The 1899 Philadelphia mayoral election saw Samuel Howell Ashbridge elected as mayor of Philadelphia.

Results

References

1899
Philadelphia
Philadelphia mayoral
19th century in Philadelphia